20 Minute Workout is the second studio album by DJ Kool, released on April 18, 1994. The title track "20-Minute Workout" was recorded live at Ivory's Nightclub in Richmond, Virginia on November 20, 1993.

Track listing
"20 Minute Workout" (Live) – 7:47    
"Bass N the Truck" – 5:03    
"4 the Brothas N the Ghetto" – 5:24    
"Funky Like a Monkey" – 5:00    
"Short Work Out" – 6:04    
"Blood of Willis" – 4:48    
"Ultra Beat, Monkey" – 3:13    
"Ultra Beat, Ghettosize" – 0:26    
"Groovy Bass N Half" – 3:01

Charts

References

External links
"20 Minute Workout" at Discogs.com

1994 albums
DJ Kool albums